The athletics competition in the 1962 Central American and Caribbean Games was held in Kingston, Jamaica.

Medal summary

Men's events

Women's events

Medal table

References

 
 
 

Athletics at the Central American and Caribbean Games
C
1962 Central American and Caribbean Games